Eero Tamminen (born 19 May 1995) is a Finnish professional footballer who plays for IFK Mariehamn, as a winger.

References

1995 births
Living people
Finnish footballers
Finland youth international footballers
Finland under-21 international footballers
SJK Akatemia players
Turun Palloseura footballers
Vaasan Palloseura players
FC Ilves players
FC Inter Turku players
IFK Mariehamn players
Veikkausliiga players
Kakkonen players
Association football wingers
People from Pihtipudas
Sportspeople from Central Finland